Wrecks-n-Effect is the debut album released by Wrecks-n-Effect. It was released on September 12, 1989 for Motown Records and featured production from Markell Riley and Redhead Kingpin. The album cover bears a winged symbol like Guy, as it bears the genre's anthem. It was released after the departure of Keith KC.

The album achieved modest success on the Billboard charts, making it to #103 on the Billboard 200 and #16 on the Top R&B Albums chart. The two singles released found greater success; "New Jack Swing", which features new jack swing pioneer Teddy Riley, reached No. 1 on the Hot Rap Tracks chart, while "Juicy" made it to No. 6 on the same chart.

This was the only album by the group to include original founding member Brandon Mitchell, as Mitchell would later be shot and killed less than a year later on August 8, 1990.

Track listing
 All songs written by Aqil Davidson, Markell Riley and Brandon Mitchell.

"New Jack Swing" (featuring Teddy Riley) – (3:45)
"Leave the Mike Smokin'" – 4:00
"Juicy" – 5:10
"Club Head" – 3:56
"Soul Man" – 4:40
"Deep" – 1:50
"Wipe Your Sweat" – 4:37
"V-Man" – 4:50
"Peanut Butter" – 3:40
"Friends to the End" (featuring The Redhead Kingpin and Scoop Rock) – (4:55)
"Rock Steady" – 2:45

Personnel
 Wrecks-n-Effect – primary artist, instrumentation
 Dave Way, Dae Bennett – recording engineers
 Teddy Riley – mixing
 Herb Powers – mastering
 Gene Griffin – executive producer

References

1989 debut albums
Wreckx-n-Effect albums